The 2021–22 season was Celtic's 133rd season of competitive football.

Pre-season and friendlies
Celtic held a pre-season training camp in Wales, with friendlies against Sheffield Wednesday, Charlton Athletic and Bristol City. They also faced Preston North End and West Ham United at Celtic Park.

Scottish Premiership

The Scottish Premiership fixture list was announced on 15 June 2021.

Scottish League Cup

On 25 July, Celtic were drawn to face Heart of Midlothian at Celtic Park in the second round of the 2021–22 Scottish League Cup. On 15 August, Celtic were drawn to face Raith Rovers at Celtic Park in the quarter-finals. On 23 September, Celtic were drawn to face St Johnstone in the semi-finals. On 21 November, it was determined that Celtic would face Hibernian in the final.

Scottish Cup

On 29 November, Celtic were drawn to face Alloa Athletic at Recreation Park in the fourth round of the 2021–22 Scottish Cup. On 22 January 2022, Celtic were drawn to face Raith Rovers at Celtic Park in the fifth round. On 14 February, Celtic were drawn to face Dundee United at Tannadice Park in the quarter-finals. On 14 March, Celtic were drawn to face Rangers in the semi-finals.

UEFA Champions League

Second qualifying round
Celtic entered the UEFA Champions League at the second qualifying round. On 16 June, they were drawn to face Midtjylland from Denmark.

UEFA Europa League

Third qualifying round
Celtic entered the UEFA Europa League at the third qualifying round. On 28 July, it was determined that they would face Jablonec from the Czech Republic.

Play-off round
On 12 August, it was determined that Celtic would face AZ from the Netherlands in the play-off round.

Group stage

On 27 August, the draw for the group stage was made. Celtic were drawn in Group G along with Bayer Leverkusen, Real Betis and Ferencváros.

Matches

UEFA Europa Conference League

Knockout round play-offs
Celtic entered the UEFA Europa Conference League in the knockout round play-offs. On 13 December, they were drawn to face Bodø/Glimt from Norway.

Statistics

Appearances and goals

|-
! colspan=18 style=background:#dcdcdc; text-align:center| Goalkeepers

|-
! colspan=18 style=background:#dcdcdc; text-align:center| Defenders

|-
! colspan=18 style=background:#dcdcdc; text-align:center| Midfielders

|-
! colspan=18 style=background:#dcdcdc; text-align:center| Forwards

|-
! colspan=18 style=background:#dcdcdc; text-align:center| Departures

|-

Notes

Goalscorers

Last updated: 14 May 2022

Disciplinary record
Includes all competitive matches. Players listed below made at least one appearance for Celtic first squad during the season.

Hat-tricks

(H) – Home; (A) – Away; (N) – Neutral

Clean sheets
As of 14 May 2022.

Attendances

Team statistics

League table

Competition overview

Results by round

Club

Technical staff

Kit
Supplier: Adidas / Sponsors: Dafabet (front) and Magners (back)

The club is in the second year of a deal with Adidas – the club's official kit supplier.

Home: The home kit features the club's traditional green and white hoops. White shorts and socks complete the look.
Away: The away kit features a dark green shirt, with a gold trim and an embroidered four-leaf clover. The shirt is accompanied by dark green shorts and socks.
Third: The third kit features a white shirt, with pink and green vertical pinstripes and a dark green collar. The shirt is accompanied by white shorts and socks.

Transfers

In

Notes

Out

See also
 List of Celtic F.C. seasons

References

Celtic F.C. seasons
Celtic
Celtic
Celtic
Celtic
Scottish football championship-winning seasons